Chen Zhongyun (born 27 January 1973 in Hejiang, Sichuan) is a Chinese sprint canoer who competed in the late 2000s. He finished fifth in the C-2 1000 m event at the 2008 Summer Olympics in Beijing.

References

External links 
 
 
 
 

1973 births
Living people
Chinese male canoeists
Olympic canoeists of China
Canoeists at the 2008 Summer Olympics
People from Luzhou
Sportspeople from Sichuan